Darragh McDonald (born 13 June 1994) is a retired Irish swimmer. He competed in the Beijing 2008 Paralympic Games, winning a silver medal in the 400m Freestyle. He also competed in the 2012 London Paralympic Games finishing first in the 400m Freestyle. He also held the title of world champion after winning the gold medal swim in the 2013 World Championships in Montreal.

McDonald retired from competitive sport in October 2015 after considerable conflict with the Irish Sports Council and Paralympics Ireland.

After graduating from University College Dublin with a degree in commerce, McDonald joined KPMG as a tax trainee in the Irish Office based in Dublin.

References

External links 
 
 Darragh McDonald - Montreal 2013 IPC Swimming World Championships at the International Paralympic Committee

1994 births
Living people
Irish male freestyle swimmers
Paralympic swimmers of Ireland
Paralympic gold medalists for Ireland
Paralympic silver medalists for Ireland
Swimmers at the 2008 Summer Paralympics
Swimmers at the 2012 Summer Paralympics
Sportspeople from County Wexford
Medalists at the 2008 Summer Paralympics
Medalists at the 2012 Summer Paralympics
S6-classified Paralympic swimmers
People from Gorey
Medalists at the World Para Swimming Championships
Medalists at the World Para Swimming European Championships
Paralympic medalists in swimming
20th-century Irish people
21st-century Irish people